El Guinardó is a neighborhood in the Horta-Guinardó district of Barcelona (Spain).

Neighbourhoods of Barcelona
Horta-Guinardó